Vasilis Hatzipanagis (born 26 October 1954) is a Greek former professional footballer. He played for Iraklis in the Greek Alpha Ethniki and Pakhtakor in the Soviet Supreme League. He also played for Greece and the Soviet Union side. Hatzipanagis has been described as "the Greek Maradona".

Career

Pakhtakor
Hatzipanagis was born in 1954 in Tashkent (capital city of Uzbek Soviet Socialist Republic), to Greek political refugees. He was scouted by Pakhtakor. They wanted to invest in this raw, yet refined player, but the law was strict: he had to apply for Soviet citizenship to be eligible for the Soviet top flight. Hatzipanagis made his professional debut at the age of 17. During his time there, he made ninety six appearances and scored twenty two goals, and gained promotion from the Soviet First League to the Soviet Supreme League in 1972.

Iraklis
With the Reign of the Colonels finally over the year before, Hatzipanagis signed for the Thessaloniki club Iraklis, and such was his reputation that he filled the stadium for his first match in December 1975. The Iraklis fans would be one of the reasons this exceptional talent never joined another team, the other being his contract with Iraklis was heavily favoured towards the club making it almost impossible for him to leave in spite of his desire to test himself in a better league. Despite interest from Lazio, Arsenal, Porto and Stuttgart, the club's board feared the consequences of selling the crowd favourite, and Hatzipanagis stayed at Iraklis until 1990. His farewell appearance for the club came in a UEFA Cup first round match against Valencia on 19 September, in a 0–0 draw. In the second leg on 3 October, the team lost 2–0 at the Mestalla Stadium, with Hatzipanagis an unused substitute. In the summer of 1980, he played abroad in the National Soccer League with Toronto Panhellenic.

International career

Soviet Union
He was called up to the Soviet Union under-19 squad. He was promoted to the senior squad and represented the Soviet Union Olympic team in the 1976 qualifying tournament. His debut was made in a 3–0 home win against Yugoslavia. He even managed to score his team's last goal in his debut. Hatzipanagis featured in three more matches (two matches against Iceland and one against Norway). However, despite being told by national coach Konstantin Beskov that his ability was "way above Greece's level", he turned his back on the Soviet league – where as a left-sided attacker he was considered second only to the great Oleh Blokhin – to move to the land of his fathers.

Greece
Another highlight for Hatzipanagis was his first appearance for the Greek national side, in a friendly match against Poland at the Apostolos Nikolaidis Stadium in May 1976. The Athens crowd were bewitched by the long-haired wonder, who seemed to do whatever he wanted with the ball. Afterwards, Hatzipanagis was notified that he was ineligible for international duty, having played for the USSR. His second appearance with the national team came many years after his retirement: he played for 20 minutes in the friendly match against Ghana on 14 December 1999 - where he was honored by the Hellenic Football Federation for his overall contribution to the game of football.

Legacy
As an attacking midfielder with Iraklis, he packed in the crowds at Thessaloniki's Kaftanzoglio Stadium, where his performances earned him the moniker of 'the footballing Nureyev'. However, the reason he gave for his fancy footwork was simple enough. "When I see defenders in front of me, I want to dribble around every one of them," he once said.

Further recognition did come on 22 June 1984, when he was invited to join a World XI featuring other legends such as Franz Beckenbauer, Mario Kempes, Kevin Keegan, Dominique Rocheteau, Peter Shilton, Jean-Marie Pfaff, Hugo Sanchez, Ruud Krol, Felix Magath and his countryman Thomas Mavros for a match against New York Cosmos in New Jersey.

In November 2003, to celebrate UEFA's 50th anniversary, he was selected as Greece's Golden Player of the past 50 years by the Hellenic Football Federation. Now aged 50, Hatzipanagis said: "It is very touching to see that you are not forgotten, that your contribution is appreciated even after so many years."

He added: "I regret not having been able to wear the Greek national jersey more than once. And I regret not having made a career abroad. I would have liked to play in a better league, to have enjoyed football at that level. If I could turn back the clock, I would do some things differently."

Honours

Club
Pakhtakor
Soviet First League
Winner (1): 1972

Iraklis
Greek Cup
Winner (1): 1975–76
Runner up (2): 1979–80, 1986–87
Balkans Cup
Winner (1): 1985

Toronto Panhellenic
Canadian National Soccer League
Play-Off Winner (1): 1980

Individual
Soviet Masters of Sports award
Master of Sports: 1974
UEFA Jubilee Awards
Greece's Golden Player: 1954–2003
Goals from direct corner kicks: 7, in the 1982-83 season

References

Notes

External links
 

1954 births
Living people
UEFA Golden Players
Greek footballers
Greece international footballers
Soviet First League players
Iraklis Thessaloniki F.C. players
Pakhtakor Tashkent FK players
Olympic footballers of the Soviet Union
Soviet footballers
Uzbekistani footballers
Sportspeople from Tashkent
Uzbekistani people of Greek descent
Soviet people of Greek descent
Super League Greece players
Association football midfielders
Canadian National Soccer League players
Soviet Union youth international footballers
Greece under-21 international footballers